Ustilentylomataceae is a family of Basidiomycota fungi in the order Microbotryales. It contains 3 genera.

References

External links

Microbotryales
Ustilentylomataceae
Taxa named by Franz Oberwinkler
Taxa described in 1997